Sketches of Etruscan Places and other Italian Essays, or Etruscan Places, is a collection of travel writings by D. H. Lawrence, first published posthumously in 1932. In this book Lawrence contrasted the life affirming world of the Etruscans with the shabbiness of Benito Mussolini's Italy during the late 1920s.

In preparing these essays, Lawrence travelled through the  countryside of Tuscany with his friend Earl Brewster during the spring of 1927.

The volume published in 1932 included the following essays:
 Cerveteri
 Tarquinia
 The Painted Tombs of Tarquinia 1
 The Painted Tombs of Tarquinia 2
 Vulci
 Volterra
 The Florence Museum

Further reading
 Sketches of Etruscan Places and other Italian Essays (1932), edited by Simonetta de Filippis, Cambridge University Press, 1992, . The essays in this definitive scholarly text, based upon Lawrence's manuscripts, typescripts and corrected proofs, include those taken from the original collection. In addition, this volume includes other Italian essays such as:
 David
 Looking Down on the City
 Europe Versus America
 Fireworks
 The Nightingale
 Man is a Hunter
 Flowery Tuscany
 Germans and English

Lawrence's original intention was to publish his text with a sequence of related photographs. Copies of these pictures can be found in:

 Etruscan Places, Foreword by Massimo Pallottino,  Nuova Immaginare Editrice, Sienna, Third Edition, 1997, 
 Etruscan Places (1932), first American edition, without other essays, New York: The Viking Press.

External links
 Internet Archive on-line edition of Etruscan Places:  (encrypted!)
 Project Gutenberg Australia on-line edition of Etruscan Places: 

Books by D. H. Lawrence
1932 non-fiction books
Viking Press books
Travel books